The 1976 Houston Oilers season was the 17th season overall and seventh with the National Football League (NFL). The team started the season 4–1 with their only loss coming by a single point to the eventual Super Bowl champion Oakland Raiders. They won only one more game, finishing the year 5–9, while failing to qualify for the playoffs for the seventh consecutive season.

Offseason

NFL draft

Roster

Schedule

Standings

References

External links
 1976 Houston Oilers at Pro-Football-Reference.com

Houston Oilers seasons
Houston Oilers
Houston